Ruby is an Arab dramatic series, it's a remake of the 2004 Mexican version produced by Televisa and written by Yolanda Vargas Dulche. It was produced in 2012 and aired on MBC1 and Lebanese Broadcasting Corporation.

Plot
Ruby is a young, ambitious Lebanese woman who falls in love with a Syrian doctor but marries his Egyptian friend who is also her friend's fiancé. Ruby left her Syrian boyfriend simply because his Egyptian friend was a millionaire, and she fell for his money. Therefore, she breaks both her friend's heart and that of her lover. And then she undergoes the consequences of her mistake by committing a series other mistakes. When married to the millionaire, she makes his life miserable. At the end, he takes his revenge on her and makes her return poorer than she originally was.

Cast
Cyrine Abdelnour - Ruby
Maxim Khalil - Omar
Diamant Bou Abboud - Shereen
Amir Karara - Tamer 
Takla Chamoun - Aliya
Pierrette Katrib - Racha
Janah Fakhoury - Em Abdo
Nada Abou Farhat - Nagham
Fady Ibrahim - Adib
Chady Haddad - Achraf
Khitam Ellaham - Wardeh
Ezzat Abou Aouf - Riad
Zaki Fatin Abdel Wahab - Fathi
Hanane Youssef - Nabila
Cynthia Khalifeh - Ghada
Assaad Hattab - Karim
Tarek Annich - Mazen
Dina El Sherbiny - Sara
Dori Al samarani - Samer
Marinelle Sarkis - Em Omar
Nicolas Mouawad - Fadi
Nada Remy - Elissar
Liza Debs - Maya
Carla Boutros - Dalal
Yusif Fawzi - Farouk
Randa Kaady - Dounia
Jihad Al Andari

See also
 List of Egyptian television series
 List of Lebanese television series

References

Arabic-language television shows
2010s Lebanese television series
2010s Egyptian television series
Egyptian drama television series
2010s drama television series
Lebanese Broadcasting Corporation International original programming